Auratonota dispersa is a species of moth of the family Tortricidae. It is found in Guatemala, Panama and Costa Rica. It has also been recorded from southern Florida in the United States, where it was probably imported with orchids from Guatemala.

The wingspan is 14–15 mm. The forewings are shiny white with a pattern of narrow brown and yellow crossbands. The hindwings are white with faint gray-brown marbling.

References

Moths described in 1990
Auratonota
Moths of North America